Kavikulguru Institute of Technology and Science (K.I.T.S) is an engineering college affiliated to the Rashtrasant Tukadoji Maharaj Nagpur University and situated in the city of Ramtek, Nagpur district in the Indian state of Maharashtra.

Engineering colleges in Maharashtra
Nagpur district